William Elwood Byerly (13 December 1849 – 20 December 1935) was an American mathematician at Harvard University where he was the "Perkins Professor of Mathematics". He was noted for his excellent teaching and textbooks. Byerly was the first to receive a Ph.D. from Harvard, and Harvard's chair "William Elwood Byerly Professor in Mathematics" is named after him. Byerly Hall in Radcliffe Yard, Radcliffe Institute for Advanced Study, Harvard University is also named for him.

Textbooks

Among the textbooks he wrote are:
 Elements of the Differential Calculus (1879)
 Harmonic Functions (1906)
 Problems in Differential Calculus
 Introduction to the Calculus of Variations (1917)
 Elements of the Integral Calculus (1881)
 An Elementary Treatise on Fourier's Series (1893)
 An Introduction to the Use of Generalized Coordinates in Mechanics and Physics (1916)

References
J. L. Coolidge, "William Elwood Byerly—In memoriam", Bull. Amer. Math. Soc. Volume 42, Number 5 (1936), pp. 295–298.
Edwin H. Hall, "William Elwood Byerly (1849-1935)", Proceedings of the American Academy of Arts and Sciences, Vol. 71, No. 10 (Mar., 1937), pp. 492–494.

Notes

1849 births
1935 deaths
American textbook writers
Harvard University alumni
Harvard University faculty
19th-century American mathematicians
20th-century American mathematicians